The Poisoned Chocolates Case (1929) is a detective novel by Anthony Berkeley set in 1920s London in which a group of armchair detectives, who have founded the "Crimes Circle", formulate theories on a recent murder case Scotland Yard has been unable to solve. Each of the six members, including their president, Berkeley's amateur sleuth Roger Sheringham, arrives at an altogether different solution as to the motive and the identity of the perpetrator, and also applies different methods of detection (basically deductive or inductive or a combination of both). Completely devoid of brutality but containing a lot of subtle, tongue-in-cheek humour instead, The Poisoned Chocolates Case is one of the classic whodunnits of the Golden Age of Detective Fiction. As at least six plausible explanations of what really happened are put forward one after the other, the reader—just like the members of the Crimes Circle themselves—is kept guessing right up to the final pages of the book.

Plot introduction
One of the most unusual, and possibly unique, features of the book is that, while it appears at first sight to be an expanded version of Berkeley's short story "The Avenging Chance", the eventual solution of the crime in the full-length novel is quite different from that in the short story. (In fact, the solution of "The Avenging Chance" is one of the suggested explanations in the novel which turns out to be false.)

Plot summary

Case
After arriving at his London club at 10:30 am precisely, which he has been doing every morning for many years, Sir Eustace Pennefather, a known womanizer whose divorce from his current wife is pending, receives a complimentary box of chocolates through the post. Disapproving of such modern marketing techniques, Sir Eustace is about to throw away the chocolates in disgust but changes his mind when he learns that Graham Bendix, another member of the club whom he hardly knows, has lost a bet with his wife Joan and now owes her a box of chocolates. Bendix takes the box home and, after lunch, tries out the new confectionery together with his wife. A few hours later Joan Bendix is dead, whereas her husband, who has eaten far fewer chocolates, is taken seriously ill and hospitalized (but later recovers). The police can establish a few facts beyond any doubt: that the parcel was posted the previous evening near The Strand; that the poison that was injected into each of the chocolates is nitrobenzene; and that the accompanying letter was typewritten on a piece of stationery from the manufacturers of the chocolates but not composed or sent by them.

Quite soon in the police investigations it becomes evident that the intended victim was Sir Eustace himself rather than the innocent Joan Bendix: no criminal could have predicted Sir Eustace giving away the box of chocolates to a man he hardly knew who just happened to be present when it was delivered. However, at a loss as to the further details of the crime, Scotland Yard conclude that the sender must have been some maniac or a fanatic trying to rid society of one of its most immoral members.

Theories
Worthy pillars of society including a barrister, a writer of detective novels, and a female author, the members of Roger Sheringham's Crimes Circle go about individually solving the case. After a week has passed, they present their findings on consecutive nights to their colleagues. Not surprisingly, they come up with various suspects: Sir Eustace's estranged wife; the father of a young lady whom Sir Eustace intended to marry after his divorce got through; one of Sir Eustace's discarded mistresses; and some more. At the very end of the novel, however, there is no doubt as to the identity of the perpetrator.

Release details
1929, UK, William Collins, 1929, hardback (First edition)
1929, US, Doubleday, Doran & Company, Inc.
1935, UK, Penguin Books, paperback
1937, UK, Penguin Books, paperback 
1950, UK, Pan Books, Pub date ? ? 1950, paperback
1983, US, Dell Publishing, Pub date ? November 1983, paperback
1983, UK, Penguin Books, Pub date ? July 1986, paperback
1991, US, Black Dagger Crime Reprints, Pub date 4 December 1991, hardback
?, US, Dales, Pub date ? ? ?, hardback (Large print edition)
2001, US, House of Stratus, Pub date 31 August 2001, paperback

External links
Gadetection.pbwiki.com The Poisoned Chocolates Case

1929 British novels
Novels by Anthony Berkeley
Novels set in London
William Collins, Sons books